Becks Run is a tributary of the Monongahela River.  As an urban stream, it is heavily polluted, receiving combined sewer outflow from Carrick (Pittsburgh) and Mount Oliver, Pennsylvania.  There is a waterfall on a tributary, just downstream from a slate dump, near the intersection of Wagner Avenue and Mountain Avenue.  There were coal mines along the stream, including Becks Run #2, owned by the estate of James H. Hays, served by an incline and the H.B. Hays and Brothers Coal Railroad.  Other mines at various times were operated by the Birmingham Coal Company, H.G. Burghman, Jones & Laughlin, and the Monongahela River Consolidated Coal and Coke Company.

It is the namesake of the Pittsburgh and Beck's Run Railroad (1877-1880), which ran from the Smithfield Street Bridge to the Jones and Laughlin Iron Works, and was absorbed by the P&LE Railroad. A former town, located where Becks Run enters the Monongahela, was also named Becks Run.

See also
 List of rivers of Pennsylvania
 Becks Run Road

References

External links
 1877 engraving of the mouth of Becks Run 
 

Pittsburgh metropolitan area
Rivers of Pennsylvania
Tributaries of the Monongahela River
Rivers of Allegheny County, Pennsylvania
Allegheny Plateau